Zenit (Macedonian Cyrillic: Зенит) is a local weekly newspaper in North Macedonia. Newspaper organizes the manifestations "Selection of business of the year" and "Selection of the best sportsman of the year of Prilep". When the newspaper started publication in 2008 it cost , was printed in black and white and had 12 pages.

References

Newspapers published in North Macedonia
Macedonian-language  newspapers
Prilep
Newspapers established in 2008